
Three French ships of the French Navy have borne the name Capricieux ("Capricious"):

 A fireship (1671)
 , a 34-gun ship of the line
 , a  64-gun ship of the line

See also

References

French Navy ship names